Cornelius "Cor" Euser (born April 25, 1957) is a Dutch racing driver from Oss. His son Michael is also a racing driver

Career
After winning several Formula Ford titles in 1980 and 1981, Euser went to the FIA European Formula Three Championship part-time in 1982 and 1983. He expanded his racing in 1984 competing in the British and German Formula Three series. He made his Formula 3000 debut in the final race of the 1986 season at Jarama after failing to qualify for the first race of the season. He made 8 Formula 3000 starts the following year but failed to score points. He finally broke into the points in 1988, finishing 19th in the championship with a 5th place at Brands Hatch. During this period, Euser also participated in an episode of Run The Gauntlet, aired on ITV in the UK in 1988.

Euser transitioned to sports car racing in 1990 making 6 starts in the World Sports-Prototype Championship. In 1991 he competed full-time in both the Sportscar World Championship and DTM and made a single start in the CART World Series for Bettenhausen Motorsports at Laguna Seca Raceway. In 1991 he also made his 24 Hours of Le Mans debut  driving for Euro Racing. In 1994 he drove at Le Mans in a Konrad Motorsport GT2 Porsche and in 1995 he became a factory driver for the Marcos racing marque.

While driving for Marcos, he purchased the rights to manufacture racing cars and entered them as Marcos Racing International. He has made several more Le Mans starts and campaigned their LM600 and Mantis cars in the BPR Global GT Series, FIA GT Championship, the British GT Championship, the Dutch Supercar Challenge, Belcar, the Spanish GT Championship, and numerous other endurance races held around the globe. As of 2016 Euser is still an active driver in various endurance races.

Racing record

Complete International Formula 3000 results
(key) (Races in bold indicate pole position; races in italics indicate fastest lap.)

Complete Deutsche Tourenwagen Meisterschaft results
(key) (Races in bold indicate pole position) (Races in italics indicate fastest lap)

PPG Indycar Series
(key) (Races in bold indicate pole position; races in italics indicate fastest lap.)

24 Hours of Le Mans results

Complete FIA GT Championship results
(key) (Races in bold indicate pole position) (Races in italics indicate fastest lap)

Complete British GT Championship results
(key) (Races in bold indicate pole position) (Races in italics indicate fastest lap)

Britcar 24 Hour results

Partial Supercar Challenge results

References

External links
Cor Euser at Driver Database
 http://www.coreuser.nl/

1957 births
Living people
Dutch racing drivers
Champ Car drivers
Formula Ford drivers
FIA European Formula 3 Championship drivers
British Formula Three Championship drivers
German Formula Three Championship drivers
International Formula 3000 drivers
British Formula 3000 Championship drivers
Rolex Sports Car Series drivers
24 Hours of Daytona drivers
24 Hours of Le Mans drivers
FIA GT Championship drivers
Deutsche Tourenwagen Masters drivers
Sportspeople from Oss
World Sportscar Championship drivers
International GT Open drivers
Britcar 24-hour drivers
Sports car racing team owners
24H Series drivers
British GT Championship drivers
Josef Kaufmann Racing drivers
Bettenhausen Racing drivers
Nürburgring 24 Hours drivers
GT4 European Series drivers